The Comunidade Intermunicipal da Região de Aveiro (English: Aveiro Region) is an administrative division in Portugal. It was created in October 2008, replacing the previously existing Greater Metropolitan Area of Aveiro. Since January 2015, Região de Aveiro is also a NUTS3 subregion of Centro Region, that covers the same area as the intermunicipal community. The main city and seat of the intermunicipal community is Aveiro.

Municipalities

The intermunicipal community of Região de Aveiro is subdivided into 11 municipalities:

References

External links
Official website Região de Aveiro

Intermunicipal communities of Portugal
Centro Region, Portugal